Gothenburg Central Station is the main railway station of Gothenburg and it is the oldest railway station in Sweden still in use. The station serves 27 million passengers per year, making it the second largest railway station in Sweden after Stockholm Central Station which it predates by 13 years. The station opened on October 4, 1858. The station is situated in the city of Gothenburg, right by Drottningtorget. The Gothenburg Central Station, Centralhuset and Nils Ericson Terminalen are a part of Resecentrum, Göteborg. Gothenburg Central Station is owned and administered by Jernhusen.

History 

Numerous railways were built across Sweden in the 19th century. One of the first distances was the one between Gothenburg and Jonsered. As the railway grew more popular, the need for a station emerged. The Gothenburg Central Station was built between 1856 and 1858. The first building was constructed between 1856 and 1857 by architect Adolf Wilhelm Edelsvärd on land which was previously occupied by a prison.

First, the building included a big entry hall, two waiting areas and a few restaurants.

In 1923 the train station was rebuilt and enlarged after Folke Zettervall's plans, who was the official SJ architect by that time. On March 14, 1923, fire destroyed large parts of the Central Station. Between 1928 and 1930 the station was enlarged due to the increased volume of traffic. After 1930 some more changes were made, including a new restaurant built in front of Drottningtorget. In 1993, the Central Station was restored and between 2000 and 2003 the Central House, was added as an extension to the existing building. The current interior design is similar to the 1923 model with wood pillars, glass ceiling and a floor made of limestone.

In the 1940s it was proposed to demolish the waiting hall, but the hall was preserved as it was decorated with paintings by artist Filip Månsson but the paintings could not be preserved and it was decided to keep the hall.

During the 19th and early 20th century about one million Swedish emigrants passed through the station in order to get to the harbour. Their final destination would be America.

In February 2007, a bomb threat was addressed to the Gothenburg police. The bombing was to take place at the Gothenburg Central Station. Later that day, a bag was found in the old parts of the station. The evacuation of the station began at 21:30 local time and two hours later the station was free to open again. The bag was examined and no high explosive was found.

In January 2010, a one square metre (11 Sq Ft) section of the station's glass ceiling collapsed after ice had fallen onto it. One person suffered bruises by falling glass splinters and big parts of the station were closed due to safety reasons.

Tracks and other connections

There are 16 platform tracks at the station. Trains depart and arrive from five different railway lines:
 To the north on the Bohus Line, towards Stenungsund, Uddevalla and Strömstad.
 To the north on the Norway/Vänern Line, towards Älvängen, Vänersborg, Karlstad and Oslo.
 To the east on the Western Main Line, towards Alingsås, Skövde, Stockholm and Luleå.
 To the south on the West Coast Line, towards Kungsbacka, Malmö and Copenhagen.
 To the southeast on Coast-to-Coast Line, towards Borås and Kalmar.

The choice of track depends mainly on which railway the train will use. This is because there is a wish to avoid crossing train paths, which would create delays. Trains to the Bohus Line and Norway/Vänern Line generally use tracks 7–11. Trains to the Western Main Line generally use tracks 1–7. Trains to the West Coast Line and Coast-to-Coast Line generally use tracks 11–16.

Drottningtorget is a junction for trams and lies right by the Gothenburg Central Station. Nordstan also has a large tram stop and a shopping mall connected to the station by an underground pedestrian tunnel.

Lounge 
The Station Lounge is located by track 9 at the station. There is an access fee of 149 SEK which includes restaurant food, newspapers and Internet access through a WLAN. There is also a bar. The conference section is supplied with modern equipment and admits 4–50 persons.

Art pieces 

Weeping Girl is a bronze sculpture in the station created by artist Laura Ford, born in Cardiff, Wales.

Facilities 
There are several facilities in the station, among them shops, a bank office, cafes, restaurants, a pharmacy, a hotel and lounges.

Maintenance 
The old parts of the station are included in the city council's Bevarningsprogram  (English: Preserving Program) 1975 and 1987.

References

Railway stations in Gothenburg
Central Station
Railway stations on the West Coast Line (Sweden)
Railway stations opened in 1858
1858 establishments in Sweden
Transit centers in Sweden